Sergiy Stakhovsky was the defending champion but was eliminated by Édouard Roger-Vasselin in the second round. Feliciano López won in the final 6–3, 6–4, against Adrian Mannarino.

Seeds

Draw

Final four

Top half

Bottom half

References
 Main Draw
 Qualifying Draw

Singles
2009